Choe Un-sim (born 6 May 1982) was a North Korean female weightlifter, competing in the 48 kg category and representing North Korea at international competitions. 

She participated at the 2004 Summer Olympics in the 48 kg event. She competed at world championships, most recently at the 2003 World Weightlifting Championships.

Major results

References

External links
 

http://www.alamy.com/stock-photo/choe-un-sim-north-korea-lifts.html

1982 births
Living people
North Korean female weightlifters
Weightlifters at the 2004 Summer Olympics
Olympic weightlifters of North Korea
Place of birth missing (living people)
Weightlifters at the 2002 Asian Games
Asian Games competitors for North Korea